Kimsaqucha  (Quechua kimsa three, qucha lake, "three lakes", Hispanicized spelling Quimsacocha) is a group of lakes in Peru located in the Cusco Region, Calca Province, Lamay District. The lakes lie northeast of Lamay and Calca and southwest of the larger lake Pampaqucha {Laguna Pampacocha) of the Calca District.

References 

Lakes of Peru
Lakes of Cusco Region